Young & Hungry is an American television sitcom created by David Holden, and executively produced by Ashley Tisdale. The multi-camera series stars Emily Osment, Jonathan Sadowski, Aimee Carrero, Kym Whitley and Rex Lee, with the series premiering on Freeform (then known as ABC Family) on June 25, 2014.

On October 24, 2016, Osment announced via Twitter that Young & Hungry had been renewed for a fifth season. It was confirmed by Emily Osment on February 6, 2018 that the show is ending after the final 10 episodes of season 5, sometime in 2018. It was confirmed by TVLine on March 15, 2018, that there is a TV movie planned that will premiere sometime after the series ends to officially conclude the show and "will further the adventures of Gabi, Josh and their circle of friends". Part 2 of season 5 premiered on June 20, 2018.

Series overview

Episodes

Season 1 (2014)

Season 2 (2015)

Special (2015)

Season 3 (2016)

Season 4 (2016)

Season 5 (2017–18)

Ratings

Season 1 (2014)

Season 2 (2015)

Season 3 (2016)

Season 4 (2016)

Season 5 (2017–18)

Webisodes

Young & Foodies (2014)

References

Lists of American LGBT-related television series episodes
Lists of American sitcom episodes